"Lifetime" is a song by American R&B/soul singer Maxwell, and is the second single from his Now album, released October 16, 2001. The song was a top five hit on Billboard's R&B/Hip-Hop songs chart and peaked at No. 22 on the Billboard Hot 100 chart.

Charts

Weekly charts

Year-end charts

References

External links
 www.musze.com

2002 singles
Maxwell (musician) songs
Songs written by Maxwell (musician)
Songs written by Stuart Matthewman
2001 songs
Columbia Records singles
Soul ballads
2000s ballads